Marcus Terentius Varro (116–27 BC) was a Roman polymath and a prolific author. He is regarded as ancient Rome's greatest scholar, and was described by Petrarch as "the third great light of Rome" (after Vergil and Cicero). He is sometimes called Varro Reatinus to distinguish him from his younger contemporary Varro Atacinus.

Biography

Varro was born in or near Reate (now Rieti) to a family thought to be of equestrian rank, and always remained close to his roots in the area, owning a large farm in the Reatine plain, reported as near Lago di Ripasottile, until his old age. He supported Pompey, reaching the office of praetor, after having been tribune of the people, quaestor and curule aedile. It is probable that Varro was discontented with the course on which Pompey entered when the First Triumvirate was formed, and he may thus have lost his chance of rising to the consulate. He actually ridiculed the coalition in a work entitled the Three-Headed Monster ( in the Greek of Appian, The Civil Wars, II.ii.9). He was one of the commission of twenty that carried out the great agrarian scheme of Caesar for the resettlement of Capua and Campania (59 BC).

During Caesar's civil war he commanded one of Pompey's armies in the Ilerda campaign. He escaped the penalties of being on the losing side in the civil war through two pardons granted by Julius Caesar, before and after the Battle of Pharsalus. Caesar later appointed him to oversee the public library of Rome in 47 BC, but following Caesar's death Mark Antony proscribed him, resulting in the loss of much of his property, including his library. As the Republic gave way to Empire, Varro gained the favour of Augustus, under whose protection he found the security and quiet to devote himself to study and writing.

Varro studied under the Roman philologist Lucius Aelius Stilo, and later at Athens under the Academic philosopher Antiochus of Ascalon. Varro proved to be a highly productive writer and turned out more than 74 Latin works on a variety of topics. Aside from his many lost works known through fragments, two endeavors stand out for historians; Nine Books of Disciplines and his compilation of the Varronian chronology. His Nine Books of Disciplines became a model for later encyclopedists, especially Pliny the Elder. The most noteworthy portion of the Nine Books of Disciplines is its use of the liberal arts as organizing principles. Varro decided to focus on identifying nine of these arts: grammar, rhetoric, logic, arithmetic, geometry, astronomy, musical theory, medicine, and architecture. Using Varro's list, mediated through Martianus Capella’s early 5th century allegory, subsequent writers defined the seven classical "liberal arts” of the medieval schools.

In 37 BC, in his old age, he also wrote on agriculture for his wife Fundania, writing a "voluminous" work De re rustica (also called Res rusticae)—similar to Cato the Elder's similar work De agri cultura—on the management of large slave-run estates.

Calendars

The compilation of the Varronian chronology was an attempt to determine an exact year-by-year timeline of Roman history up to his time. It is based on the traditional sequence of the consuls of the Roman Republic—supplemented, where necessary, by inserting "dictatorial" and "anarchic" years. It has been demonstrated to be somewhat erroneous but has become the widely accepted standard chronology, in large part because it was inscribed on the arch of Augustus in Rome; though that arch no longer stands, a large portion of the chronology has survived under the name of Fasti Capitolini.

Works
Varro's literary output was prolific; Ritschl estimated it at 74 works in some 620 books, of which only one work survives complete, although we possess many fragments of the others, mostly in Gellius' Attic Nights. He was called "the most learned of the Romans" by Quintilian, and also recognized by Plutarch as "a man deeply read in Roman history".

Varro was recognized as an important source by many other ancient authors, among them Cicero, Pliny the Elder, Virgil in the Georgics, Columella, Aulus Gellius, Macrobius, Augustine, and Vitruvius, who credits him (VII.Intr.14) with a book on architecture.

His only complete work extant, Rerum rusticarum libri tres (Three Books on Agriculture), has been described as "the well digested system of an experienced and successful farmer who has seen and practised all that he records."

One noteworthy aspect of the work is his anticipation of microbiology and epidemiology. Varro warned his readers to avoid swamps and marshland, since in such areas

...there are bred certain minute creatures which cannot be seen by the eyes, but which float in the air and enter the body through the mouth and nose and cause serious diseases.

Extant works

 De lingua latina libri XXV (or On the Latin Language in 25 Books, of which six books (V–X) survive, partly mutilated)
 Rerum rusticarum libri III (or Agricultural Topics in Three Books)

Known lost works
 Saturarum Menippearum libri CL or Menippean Satires in 150 books
 Antiquitates rerum humanarum et divinarum libri XLI (Antiquities of Human and Divine Things)
 Logistoricon libri LXXVI
 Hebdomades vel de imaginibus
 Disciplinarum libri IX (An encyclopedia on the liberal arts, of which the first book dealt with grammar)
 De rebus urbanis libri III (or On Urban Topics in Three Books)
 De gente populi Romani libri IIII (cf. Augustine, 'De civitate dei' xxi. 8.)
 De sua vita libri III (or On His Own Life in Three Books)
 De familiis troianis (or On the Families of Troy)
 De Antiquitate Litterarum libri II (addressed to the tragic poet Lucius Accius; it is therefore one of his earliest writings)
 De Origine Linguae Latinae libri III (addressed to Pompey; cf. Augustine, 'De civitate dei' xxii. 28.)
 Περί Χαρακτήρων (in at least three books, on the formation of words)
 Quaestiones Plautinae libri V (containing interpretations of rare words found in the comedies of Plautus)
 De Similitudine Verborum libri III (on regularity in forms and words)
 De Utilitate Sermonis libri IIII (on the principle of anomaly or irregularity)
  libri V (?) (addressed to Marcellus, on orthography and the metres of poetry)
 De philosophia (cf. Augustine, 'De civitate dei' xix. 1.)

Most of the extant fragments of these works (mostly the grammatical works) can be found in the Goetz–Schoell edition of De Lingua Latina, pp. 199–242; in the collection of Wilmanns, pp. 170–223; and in that of Funaioli, pp. 179–371.

References

Further reading
 Cardauns, B. Marcus Terentius Varro: Einführung in sein Werk. Heidelberger Studienhefte zur Altertumswissenschaft. Heidelberg, Germany: C. Winter, 2001.
 d’Alessandro, P. “Varrone e la tradizione metrica antica”. Spudasmata, volume 143. Hildesheim; Zürich; New York: Georg Olms Verlag, 2012.
 Dahlmann, H.M. “Terentius Varro. Paulys Realencyclopädie der classischen Altertumswissenschaft”. Supplement 6, Abretten bis Thunudromon. Edited by Wilhelm Kroll, 1172–1277. Stuttgart: Metzler, 1935.
 Ferriss-Hill, J. “Varro’s Intuition of Cognate Relationships.” Illinois Classical Studies, volume 39, 2014, pp. 81–108.
 Freudenburg, K. "The Afterlife of Varro in Horace's Sermones: Generic Issues in Roman Satire." Generic Interfaces in Latin Literature: Encounters, Interactions and Transformations, edited by Stavros Frangoulidis, De Gruyter, 2013, pp. 297–336.
 Kronenberg, L. Allegories of Farming from Greece and Rome: Philosophical Satire in Xenophon, Varro and Virgil. Cambridge/New York: Cambridge University Press, 2009. 
 Nelsestuen, G. Varro the Agronomist: Political Philosophy, Satire, and Agriculture in the Late Republic. Columbus: Ohio State University Press, 2015.
 Richardson, J.S. “The Triumph of Metellus Scipio and the Dramatic Date of Varro, RR 3.” The Classical Quarterly, volume 33, no. 2, 1983, pp. 456–463. 
 Taylor, D.J.. Declinatio : A Study of the Linguistic Theory of Marcus Terentius Varro. Amsterdam: John Benjamins Publishing Company, 1974. 
 Van Nuffelen, P. “Varro’s Divine Antiquities: Roman Religion as an Image of Truth.” Classical Philology, volume 105, no. 2, 2010, pp. 162–188.

External links 

 
 
 
 de Re Rustica (Latin and English at LacusCurtius)
 Links to translation of De Linga Latina by R.G.Kent
 Livius.org: Varronian chronology
 thelatinlibrary.com: Latin works of Varro
 Oxford Classical Dictionary
 Oxford Bibliographies

116 BC births
27 BC deaths
2nd-century BC Romans
1st-century BC Roman praetors
1st-century BC writers
Ancient linguists
Ancient Roman antiquarians
Ancient Roman scholars of religion
Ancient Roman soldiers
Ancient Roman writers
Encyclopedias in classical antiquity
Roman encyclopedists
Geoponici
Golden Age Latin writers
People from Rieti
Recipients of ancient Roman pardons
Roman-era students in Athens
Varro, Marcus
Latinists